Marcel Sauvage (26 October 1895, Paris – 4 June 1988, Peymeinade) was a French journalist and writer.

Career 
In 1919 he pooled his demobilisation bonus with Florent Fels to found the magazine Action: Cahiers individualistes de philosophie et d’art.

In May 1922 he attended the International Congress of Progressive Artists and signed the "Founding Proclamation of the Union of Progressive International Artists".

Family 
He was married to the novelist Paule Malardot.

References 

1895 births
1988 deaths
Writers from Paris
20th-century French non-fiction writers